Kachhwa is a town and a nagar panchayat in Mirzapur district in the Indian state of Uttar Pradesh.

Geography
It has an average elevation of 84 metres (275 feet).
It is around 30 km. away from Varanasi Cantt.

Demographics
As of 2011 Indian Census, Kachhwa had a total population of 15,958, of which 8,363 were males and 7,595 were females. Population within the age group of 0 to 6 years was 2,240. The total number of literates in Kachhwa was 10,846, which constituted 68.0% of the population with male literacy of 76.5% and female literacy of 58.6%. The effective literacy rate of 7+ population of Kachhwa was 79.1%, of which male literacy rate was 88.8% and female literacy rate was 68.3%. The Scheduled Castes and Scheduled Tribes population was 2,369 and 39 respectively. Kachhwa had 2249 households in 2011.

 India census, Kachhwa had a population of 14,712. Males constitute 54% of the population and females 46%. Kachhwa has an average literacy rate of 57%, lower than the national average of 59.5%: male literacy is 66%, and female literacy is 46%. In Kachhwa, 16% of the population is under 6 years of age.

References

Cities and towns in Mirzapur district